Nur Kusyairy Zakuan bin Osman (born 19 February 1980), known professionally as Beto Kusyairy, is a Malaysian actor.

Filmography

Film

Short films

Television series

Telemovie

Television

References

External links
 
 
 
 

1980 births
Living people
Malaysian male actors
21st-century Malaysian male actors
Malaysian male film actors